Klamath County is one of the 36 counties in the U.S. state of Oregon. As of the 2020 census, the population was 69,413. The county seat is Klamath Falls. The county was named for the Klamath, the tribe of Native Americans living in the area at the time the first European explorers entered the region. Klamath County comprises the Klamath Falls, OR Micropolitan Statistical Area.

History
The Klamath or Clamitte tribe of Indians, for which Klamath County was named, are the descendants of varying cultures of indigenous peoples, who have lived in the area for more than 10,000 years.

When European-Americans began to travel through the area in 1846 along the Applegate Trail, they competed with the Klamath for game and water, which precipitated clashes between the peoples. This was exacerbated by European-American settlers, who cleared the land to farm and encroached on hunting territory. They were successful in demanding the removal of American Indians to reservations.

The Modoc people, having been removed to Oregon to share a reservation with the Klamath, traditional rivals, wanted a reservation created on Lost River, near present-day Merrill, Oregon. Captain Jack led his band back to Lost River, but the US Army, accompanied by militia and citizens of Linkville (present-day Klamath Falls) arrived and convinced Captain Jack to return. An argument broke out, shots were fired, and the Modoc War began as the Modoc fled to Captain Jack's Stronghold in northern California.

A treaty was signed with the Klamath on October 14, 1864, which led to the establishment of the Klamath Reservation. At various times over the next 40 years, different individuals of the Modoc tribe were settled within the reservation.

Because of the extensive tracts of forest, the Klamath were very well off as a people until the termination of the reservation by the U.S. government in 1954. Termination parceled the communally managed land into individual sections, which tribe members could not manage on their own and were largely forced to sell to speculators.

A few of the Klamath refused to accept the buyout money, most notably Edison Chiloquin (1924–2003). Instead of cash, he insisted on receiving the title to ancestral land along the Sprague River where he lived. On December 5, 1980, the Chiloquin Act was signed into law, giving him title to the properties he wanted.

Geography

It is the fourth-largest county in Oregon.

Adjacent counties
 Douglas County (northwest)
 Lane County (northwest)
 Deschutes County (north)
 Lake County (east)
 Siskiyou County, California (south)
 Modoc County, California (south)
 Jackson County (west)

National protected areas

 Bear Valley National Wildlife Refuge
 Crater Lake National Park (part)
 Deschutes National Forest (part)
 Fremont National Forest (part)
 Klamath Marsh National Wildlife Refuge
 Lower Klamath National Wildlife Refuge (part)
 Rogue River – Siskiyou National Forest (part)
 Upper Klamath National Wildlife Refuge
 Winema National Forest (part)

Demographics

2000 census
As of the census of 2000, there were 63,775 people, 25,205 households, and 17,290 families living in the county.  The population density was 11 people per square mile (4/km2). There were 28,883 housing units at an average density of 5 per square mile (2/km2). The racial makeup of the county was 87.33% White, 0.63% Black or African American, 4.19% Native American, 0.80% Asian, 0.12% Pacific Islander, 3.45% from other races, and 3.47% from two or more races. 7.78% of the population were Hispanic or Latino of any race. 16.7% were of German, 10.8% Irish, 10.7% English and 9.8% United States or American ancestry. 92.6% spoke English and 6.1% Spanish as their first language.

There were 25,205 households, out of which 30.30% had children under the age of 18 living with them, 54.20% were married couples living together, 10.00% had a female householder with no husband present, and 31.40% were non-families. 25.30% of all households were made up of individuals, and 10.40% had someone living alone who was 65 years of age or older. The average household size was 2.49 and the average family size was 2.95.

In the county, the population was spread out, with 25.80% under the age of 18, 8.60% from 18 to 24, 25.50% from 25 to 44, 25.20% from 45 to 64, and 14.90% who were 65 years of age or older. The median age was 38 years. For every 100 females there were 100.10 males. For every 100 females age 18 and over, there were 97.30 males.

The median income for a household in the county was $31,537, and the median income for a family was $38,171. Males had a median income of $32,052 versus $22,382 for females. The per capita income for the county was $16,719. About 12.00% of families and 16.80% of the population were below the poverty line, including 22.40% of those under age 18 and 7.70% of those age 65 or over.

2010 census
As of the 2010 census, there were 66,380 people, 27,280 households, and 17,831 families living in the county. The racial makeup of the county was 85.9% white, 4.1% American Indian, 0.9% Asian, 0.7% black or African American, 0.1% Pacific islander, 4.1% from other races, and 4.1% from two or more races. Those of Hispanic or Latino origin made up 10.4% of the population. In terms of ancestry, 20.0% were German, 14.7% were Irish, 11.9% were English, and 5.5% were American.

Of the 27,280 households, 28.4% had children under the age of 18 living with them, 49.7% were married couples living together, 10.7% had a female householder with no husband present, 34.6% were non-families, and 27.3% of all households were made up of individuals. The average household size was 2.40 and the average family size was 2.88. The median age was 41.7 years.

The median income for a household in the county was $41,818 and the median income for a family was $51,596. Males had a median income of $42,215 versus $30,413 for females. The per capita income for the county was $22,081. About 12.7% of families and 16.6% of the population were below the poverty line, including 21.8% of those under age 18 and 9.1% of those age 65 or over.

Communities

Cities
Bonanza
Chiloquin
Klamath Falls (county seat)
Malin
Merrill

Census-designated places

Altamont
Beatty
Beaver Marsh
Bly
Chemult
Crescent
Crescent Lake
Falcon Heights
Fort Klamath
Gilchrist
Keno
Oregon Shores
Rocky Point
Running Y Ranch
Sprague River

Other unincorporated communities

Ady
Algoma
Cascade Summit
Dairy
Fairhaven
Hager
Hatfield (part)
Haynesville
Henley
Hildebrand
Hot Springs
Kirk
Klamath Agency
Lake of the Woods
Langell Valley
Lenz
Lorella
Malone
Midland
Modoc Point
Odell Lake
Odessa
Olene
Pelican City
Pine Grove
Pine Ridge
Shevlin
Worden
Yonna

Government

Politics
Like most of southwestern Oregon, Klamath County is a Republican stronghold. The county has reliably given a majority of its votes to Republican politicians for years; the last time a Democratic candidate for US president carried Klamath County was in 1964, when Lyndon Johnson won by a landslide nationwide against Barry Goldwater — but only by three percentage points in Klamath County.

Klamath County is represented in the Oregon House of Representatives by two Republicans, E. Werner Reschke and Emily McIntire, and in the Oregon State Senate by Republican Dennis Linthicum. Federally, Cliff Bentz, a Republican, is Klamath County's representative in the United States House from the 2nd district.

Economy

Historically, Klamath County's economy was based on timber and agriculture, and although these natural resource industries now contribute only a small fraction to the region's current economic activity and employment, their legacy lives on in local politics, community identity, and landscape. Euro-American settlement in the area was spurred in the early 20th century with the coming of the railroad. In addition, the government-subsidized federal reclamation project, the Klamath Irrigation Project, dammed upper tributaries and drained much of the  Lower Klamath and Tule lakes to convert  of former lakebed and wetlands into farmland, to be supported by irrigation.

Today the Sky Lakes Medical Center is the largest employer in the area, followed by Klamath County School District and Jeld-Wen, a manufacturer of doors and windows. The area is currently experiencing a boom in housing construction, as its proximity to California brings waves of retirees from population centers to the south. Outdoor recreation, such as hiking, hunting, and world-class trout fishing, as well as Oregon's only National Park at Crater Lake, contribute to the economy of the area. A complex of six National Wildlife Refuges—Klamath Basin National Wildlife Refuges Complex—seasonally draw some of the largest concentrations of waterfowl in North America. The area is world-renowned as a birdwatcher's paradise.  Natural geothermal hot wells provide heat for many homes, businesses, and the Oregon Institute of Technology campus. The full potential of this energy resource continues to be studied.

Education

Colleges and universities
Klamath Community College
Oregon Institute of Technology

See also
National Register of Historic Places listings in Klamath County, Oregon
List of parks in Klamath Falls, Oregon

References

External links

Klamath County, Oregon (official website)
Klamath County Chamber of Commerce
Klamath Visitor & Convention Bureau
Klamath County Economic Development
Klamath Falls Downtown Association

 
Oregon placenames of Native American origin
1882 establishments in Oregon
Populated places established in 1882